Ric Frazier (born April 1971 in Freeport, Texas) is an American photographer and an advertising director specializing in underwater photography.

He grew up in nearby Lake Jackson, Texas. He  graduated in 1996 from  Brooks Institute of Photography with a BA in Industrial Scientific Photography and moved to Los Angeles to pursue a career in photography. Ric has been interviewed by many magazines on how he creates his images.

Frazier has done advertising work for corporations such as Kodak, MTV, Hilton, Bayer, Shell Oil, Valspar, Wyeth, Allergan, and GlaxoSmithKline. His photos have appeared in ESPN Magazine, Inc., People, GQ, Outside, Shape Magazine and numerous other publications.

Videography
 2008 Alanis Morissette - "Underneath"

Awards
 2007 Communication Arts Photo Annual
 2007 Applied Arts Photo Annual
 2007 Elevate Film Festival, Best Music Video Director
 2007 Underwatercompetition.com Wide-Angle Unrestricted 2007
 2007 Underwatercompetition.com Video 2007
 2006 Alternative Pick Awards 2006
 2005 Marketing Awards 2005
 2004 Lucie Awards 2004

References

External links 
 Official Ric Frazier Site 

People from Freeport, Texas
American photographers
Underwater photographers
Living people
Brooks Institute alumni
Artists from Los Angeles
1971 births